Tomandl Nunatak is an isolated nunatak on the south side of Crevasse Valley Glacier, 7 nautical miles (13 km) east of Mount Stancliff, in the Ford Ranges of Marie Byrd Land. Mapped by United States Geological Survey (USGS) from surveys and U.S. Navy air photos, 1959–65. Named by Advisory Committee on Antarctic Names (US-ACAN) for Frank Tomandl, Jr., aviation electrician's mate, U.S. Navy, of the McMurdo Station winter party, 1968.

Nunataks of Marie Byrd Land